Trond Fevolden (born 30 December 1951) is a Norwegian civil servant.

He graduated as cand.polit. in political science from the University of Oslo in 1980, and was hired as a subdirector in the Norwegian Office of the Prime Minister. He spent one year as deputy under-secretary of State before moving to the Ministry of Education, where he was permanent Secretary General from 1992 to 2016.

References

1951 births
Living people
Norwegian civil servants
University of Oslo alumni